The 1978 LPGA Tour was the 29th season since the LPGA Tour officially began in 1950. The season ran from February 10 to November 12. The season consisted of 34 official money events. Nancy Lopez won the most tournaments, nine. She also led the money list with earnings of $189,814.

There were four first-time winners in 1978: Janet Coles, Shelley Hamlin, Nancy Lopez, and Michiko Okada. Lopez was the first (and as of 2011, only) player to be named LPGA Rookie of the Year and LPGA Player of the Year in the same year. She won 48 LPGA events in her career.

The tournament results and award winners are listed below.

Tournament results
The following table shows all the official money events for the 1978 season. "Date" is the ending date of the tournament. The numbers in parentheses after the winners' names are the number of wins they had on the tour up to and including that event. Majors are shown in bold.

* - non-member at time of win

Awards

References

External links
LPGA Tour official site
1978 season coverage at golfobserver.com

LPGA Tour seasons
LPGA Tour